Isadore Aaron "Ike" Joselove (September 30, 1904 – June 6, 1925) was a college football player. He was killed in an automobile accident. He attended Tech High School in Atlanta.

University of Georgia
Joselove was a prominent guard for the Georgia Bulldogs football team of the University of Georgia.

1924
In 1924, he was selected All-Southern by the players of Vanderbilt University.

References

Jewish American sportspeople
Players of American football from Georgia (U.S. state)
Georgia Bulldogs football players
All-Southern college football players
American football guards
1904 births
1925 deaths
20th-century American Jews
Road incident deaths in Georgia (U.S. state)